Achaea orthogramma is a species of moth of the family Erebidae. It is found in Africa, including Madagascar.

Its larvae feed on Syzygium cumini, a Myrtaceae.

References

Achaea (moth)
Moths of Madagascar
Erebid moths of Africa
Moths described in 1879